Cold Spring Harbor Fire District Hook and Ladder Company Building is a historic fire station located at Cold Spring Harbor in Suffolk County, New York.  It was built about 1880 as a harness shop and adapted in 1896 to house the equipment of the newly formed Cold Spring Harbor fire department.  It is a one-story, wood-framed building with a gable roof.  It was moved to the rear of the lot on which it is located in 1930.

It was added to the National Register of Historic Places in 2003.

References

External links
Cold Spring Harbor Fire Station Museum 

Fire stations on the National Register of Historic Places in New York (state)
Fire stations completed in 1896
Buildings and structures in Suffolk County, New York
Defunct fire stations in New York (state)
National Register of Historic Places in Suffolk County, New York
1896 establishments in New York (state)